A submarine's net cutter is a device mounted on the bows of some naval submarines to cut through anti-submarine netting.
Some net cutters are powered by explosives.

See also
 Torpedo net cutter
 Net cutter (fisheries patrol)

References

Anti-submarine warfare